Goa Shipyard Limited (GSL) is an Indian Government owned ship building company located on the West Coast of India at Vasco da Gama, Goa. It was established in 1957, originally by the colonial government of the Portuguese in India as the "Estaleiros Navais de Goa", to build barges to be used in Goa's growing mining industry, which took off after the establishment of India's blockade of Goa in 1955. In the wake of Portugal's defeat and unconditional surrender to India following the 1961 Indian annexation of Goa, it was requisitioned to manufacture warships for the Indian Navy and the Indian Coast Guard.

GSL is undergoing a modernisation of its yard to adapt to the latest technology in shipbuilding. To this purpose it is negotiating with well-known shipbuilders for an arrangement to collaborate. To date it has built 167 vessels, including barges, tugs, landing craft, offshore patrol vessels and other vessels for the Indian Navy and Coast Guard and for export to countries like Yemen.

A new slipway has been commissioned to take up major repair jobs of ships in the dry dock area. A damage control simulator and two double boom level luffing cranes for heavy lifting have been constructed.

Military ships built
GSL has built the following ships for military use:

Landing craft Mark II
 L34 – commissioned 28 January 1980
 L33 – 1 December 1980
 L35 – 11 December 1983
 L36 – 18 July 1986
 L37 – 18 October 1986
 L38 – 10 December 1986
 L39 – 25 March 1987

Saryu class offshore patrol vessel
 INS Saryu (P54)
 INS Sunayna (P58)
 SLNS Sayurala (P623)
SLNS Sindurala (P624)

Vikram class offshore patrol vessel
 CGS Varad (40) – 19 July 1990
 CGS Varaha (41) – 19 July 1990

Samar class offshore patrol vessel
 CGS Samar (42) – 14 February 1996
 CGS Sangram (43) – 29 March 1997
 CGS Sarang (44) – 21 June 1999
 CGS Sagar (45) – 3 November 2003

Tarantul I class missile corvette
 INS Vinash (K47) – 20 November 1993
 INS Vidyut (K48) – 16 January 1995
 INS Prahar (K98) – 1 March 1997 Lost at sea on 22 April 2006
 INS Pralaya (K91) – Missile Corvette 18 December 2002

Extra fast patrol vessel
 CGS Sarojini Naidu (229) – 11 November 2002
 CGS Durgabai Deshmukh (230) – 29 April 2003
 CGS Kasturba Gandhi (231) – 28 October 2005
 CGS Aruna Asaf Ali (232) – 28 January 2006
 CGS Subhadra Kumari Chauhan (233) – 28 April 2006

In 1997, GSL built the three-masted barque INS Tarangini for use as a training ship for the Indian Navy.

Offshore Patrol Vessel
  – 10 November 2015

Future ships 
GSL has been nominated to build the following class of ships for the Indian Navy and Coast Guard :

Future Indian minehunter class 
GSL will jointly build twelve Mine Counter-Measure Vessels in collaboration with a ToT partner selected as per procedure.

Talwar class frigates 
GSL will build two Talwar-class frigates in collaboration with Russia's United Ship Building.

Fast Patrol Boats For Indian Army 
GSL has bagged an Order of Rs.65 Crore from Indian Army to build 12 fast patrol boats for the surveillance and patrolling at large water bodies. The First Vessel is expected to be delivered by July end of 2021.

Future Pollution Control vessels 

GSL will Construct two Pollution Control Vessels for the Indian Coast Guard . These vessels will be independently designed, developed and built by GSL. Both vessels are scheduled for delivery by November 2024, and May 2025, respectively.

Other products
 Tugboat
 Surface effect ships
 Hovercraft
 High-speed aluminium-hulled vessels
 Pollution control vessels
 Advanced deep sea commercial trawlers
 Fish factory vessels, Catamarans
Ferry

See also
 Cochin Shipyard
 Garden Reach Shipbuilders and Engineers
 Hindustan Shipyard
 Mazagon Dock Limited

References

External links 
 Website

Shipbuilding companies of India
Indian Navy
Government-owned companies of India
Fishing boat builders
Companies based in Goa
Buildings and structures in Vasco da Gama, Goa
1957 establishments in Portuguese India
Manufacturing companies established in 1957